Nallacheruvu is a village in Sri Sathya Sai district of the Indian state of Andhra Pradesh. It is the headquarters of Nallacheruvu mandal in Kadiri revenue division.

References 

Villages in Sri Sathya Sai district
Mandal headquarters in Sri Sathya Sai district